Green Wheat Field with Cypress (French: Champ de blé vert avec cyprès) is an oil-on-canvas painting by Dutch Post-Impressionist Vincent van Gogh.

Like many similar works at this time, the landscape painting was made on a size 30 canvas and measures .  It depicts a field of largely green wheat with parts ripening to yellow.  A tall dark fastigiate cypress tree is at the centre of the scene, next to a small white house, with mountains in the background, and a blue sky with white clouds above. The painting was completed in 1889, while van Gogh was voluntarily incarcerated at the asylum of St. Paul near Saint-Rémy in Provence. 

On 16 June 1889, Vincent wrote to his sister Wil that he had just completed the painting, just a few days after he was allowed out to paint en plein air: 

He sent an ink drawing of the painting (F1548, JH1726) with a letter to his brother Theo in early July 1889.  The drawing is now in the Morgan Library & Museum in New York City.  Van Gogh probably sent the painting to Theo with a consignment in September 1889.

Van Gogh made several other paintings of wheat fields with cypresses when he was able to leave the asylum grounds and explore the local landscape, with the wheat rapidly turning to a ripe yellow. Besides a fondness for cypresses, van Gogh had a special affinity with wheat fields; he depicted them dozens of times over the years; to Vincent they symbolized the cycle of life and death, and he found in them both solace and inspiration.

Although the composition is similar to several paintings by other artists such as Monet, Renoir, Sisley, and Pissarro, the art historian Ronald Pickvance says that "compared to high Impressionist practice, color is used more locally and the brushstrokes are more organic and vigorously hatched." However, "with no spatial distortions, no excessively heightened color tonalities, and no revolutionary symbolism, this landscape affirms its normality within an Impressionist convention. It neither manifests psychological tension nor projects a morbid vision."

References

External link
 
 Green Field, Google Arts & Culture
 Green Wheat ("Zelené obilí"), National Gallery Prague

1889 paintings
Paintings of Arles by Vincent van Gogh
Paintings in the collection of the National Gallery Prague
Farming in art